is a historic waterway in Japan connecting Lake Biwa to the nearby City of Kyoto. Constructed during the Meiji Period the canal was originally designed for the transportation of lake water for drinking, irrigation and industrial purposes, but also provided for the conveyance of waterborne freight and passenger traffic. From 1895 water from the canal supported Japan's first hydroelectric power facility, providing electricity for industry, street lighting and Kyoto's tram system. In 1996 the canal was recognized as a nationally designated Historic Site.

While no longer used as a navigable waterway for freight, the waterway continues to provide water for drinking and irrigation purposes to the city of Kyoto as well as hydroelectric power through the 4.5MW Phase III Keage power station. Locations along the canal route and associated irrigation structures such as the former Keage Incline, the Nanzen-ji aqueduct and Philosopher's Walk, have become popular sightseeing destinations.

History
Following the Meiji Restoration and the subsequent transfer of the capital to Tokyo, the city of Kyoto suffered a decline in commercial activity and a decrease in population. To address this problem, the third Prefectural Governor of Kyoto, advocated for the construction of a canal from Lake Biwa to provide both water for irrigation and industrial use as well as facilitate transportation of goods by a means of a navigable waterway.

The feasibility of an irrigation channel to Kyoto from Lake Biwa had been debated since at least the 17th Century, but written plans and initial survey work for a canal first began in 1873. In 1882, Minami Ichirobe, who had worked with Cornelis Johannes van Doorn on the Asaka Canal in Fukushima Prefecture, was commissioned by the City of Kyoto to make a survey for the route of the proposed Lake Biwa Canal. On the basis of his May 1883 graduation thesis, entitled the ‘Lake Biwa Canal Construction Project,’ Tanabe was subsequently hired as the canal project's Chief Engineer.

First Canal and Phase I Hydroelectric Power Facility

Construction work for the first canal (which went up to the confluence point between Ōtsu and the Kamo River) began in August 1885. Both main and branch canals covering a distance of 6.9 miles (11.2 km) were completed five years later in April 1890. On completion the canal passed through two locks, an inclined plane and three tunnels.

The whole enterprise was estimated at 1,250,000 silver dollars, paid for by the central government (one quarter), the Meiji Emperor (one third), and local taxes.

During construction project Chief Engineer Tanabe visited the United States in 1888 to investigate canal based transportation systems. Although canal based transport for commercial goods was found to be only marginally viable, Tanabe also had the opportunity to observe hydropower projects in Lowell and Holyoke, Massachusetts as well as at Aspen, Colorado. After consulting with North American engineers, the idea of building a power station, fashioned after the Aspen hydroelectric plant and utilizing the high head streams available on the Lake Biwa Canal was put into practice.

The first Phase I hydroelectric power station utilizing two 120 HP Pelton turbines and two Edison 80 kW DC generators became operational in August 1891. Subsequent augmentations to the Phase I power station meant that by 1897, 20 turbines were producing 1,760 kW of power through a variety DC and AC generators imported from Siemens of Germany and GE of the United States.

In 1894 the Kamo River Waterway—started in 1892—was completed, uniting Kamo River and Fushimi ward.

Second Canal and Phase II Hydroelectric Power Facility

Due to rapidly increasing demand for tap water and electricity, plans were made by Kikujiro Saigo, the second mayor of Kyoto City, for the construction of the second route (Canal No. 2) to be built independent of the first Lake Biwa Canal. Construction work on the second canal was started in October 1908, and was completed in April 1912. With a resulting increase of water intake from 8.3 m3/s to 23.65 m3/s a water treatment plant and upgraded Phase II hydroelectric power plant were also erected. The original Phase I power station was decommissioned, but with the commissioning of the Phase II power station and two additional sub stations, overall generation capacity from the Lake Biwa Canal rose to 6,400 kW by May 1914.

Route and Current Usage
The waterway runs from the vicinity of Mii-dera in Ōtsu, Shiga to its terminus near Nanzen-ji in Kyoto through a series of tunnels and along concreted irrigation channels around the mountains.

Due to the 36 meter difference in elevation between the upstream dam and its terminus, an inclined plane was built, which allowed boats to travel on land via the use of a flat car on which they were placed. Operation of the  track gauge incline ceased in 1948, but part of its structure, known as the Keage Incline, has been preserved and is now a tourist attraction, famous for its ornamental cherry trees.

Following the development of the railway and road infrastructure, the role of the canal as a means of transportation was largely over by the 1940s. From 2018 however, limited passenger boat traffic returned with the opening of the Lake Biwa Canal Cruise on open portions of the main canal between Keage and Ōtsu.

Museum

The museum reopened after renovation in 2009.

See also
 Biwako Quasi-National Park
 The 100 Views of Nature in Kansai

References

Further reading

External links

  Lake Biwa Canal Museum of Kyoto (pamphlet with timeline)
  The Lake Biwa Canal Museum of Kyoto
  Setting an Industrial Tourism Route of the Lake Biwa Canal in Keage, Kyoto (TICCIH 2006 Congress paper)
  Selection of waterways 
  The Lake Biwa Canal Museum of Kyoto (tourist guide)

Buildings and structures in Shiga Prefecture
Buildings and structures in Kyoto
Canals in Japan
Buildings of the Meiji period
Historic Sites of Japan
Transport in Shiga Prefecture
Transport in Kyoto